Owlsmoor is a suburb of Sandhurst in Berkshire, England, and part of the civil parish of Sandhurst.

Geography
Owlsmoor has a Site of Special Scientific Interest just to the west of the suburb, called Sandhurst to Owlsmoor Bogs and Heaths, which includes a nature reserve called Wildmoor Heath

Schools
 Sandhurst School
 Owlsmoor Primary School

References 

Sandhurst, Berkshire